The 2021–22 Basketball Cup of Serbia is the 16th season of the Serbian 2nd-tier men's cup tournament.

Finalists Borac Zemun and Radnički Kragujevac got qualified for the 2022 Radivoj Korać Cup. In the final, Borac won over Radnički.

Bracket
Source: srbijasport.net

Quarterfinals
All times are local UTC+1.

Radnik v Radnički Kragujevac

Metalac v Vojvodina

Borac Zemun v Pirot

Joker v Beko

Semifinals
All times are local UTC+1.

Metalac v Radnički Kragujevac

Joker v Borac Zemun

Final

See also 
 2021–22 Radivoj Korać Cup
 2021–22 Second Men's League of Serbia
 2021–22 Basketball League of Serbia

References

External links 
 

Basketball Cup of Serbia
Cup